was a Japanese physicist, known for his explanation of the Kikuchi lines that show up in diffraction patterns of diffusely scattered electrons.

Biography
Seishi Kikuchi was born and grew up in Tokyo. He graduated in 1926 from Tokyo Imperial University.

In 1928, Kikuchi and Shoji Nishikawa observed and gave a theoretical explanation of the electron backscatter diffraction pattern from a calcite cleavage face. In 1929, he went to Germany as a student. In 1934, he was appointed as professor at Osaka Imperial University and directed the construction of Japan's first DC high voltage Cockcroft-Walton accelerator.

In 1955, he was appointed as the first director of the Institute of Nuclear Research at the University of Tokyo, and successfully presided over the completion of the variable energy cyclotron.

Between 1959 and 1964, he was chairman of the Japan Atomic Energy Research Institute.

References

Japanese nuclear physicists
Japanese physicists
1902 births
1974 deaths
People from Tokyo
University of Tokyo alumni
Academic staff of the University of Tokyo
Academic staff of Osaka University
Recipients of the Order of Culture
Recipients of the Order of the Sacred Treasure, 1st class
Riken personnel